The Salzbach, which is initially called the Kröppenbach and then the Buchbach, is with a length of around  the longest tributary of the Lauter, which here in its upper reaches is known as the Wieslauter. It flows through the northwestern Wasgau, a hill range which comprises the southern part of the Palatinate Forest in the German state of Rhineland-Palatinate and the northern part of the Vosges in the French departments of Bas-Rhin and Moselle.

Course 
Strictly speaking the stream called the Salzbach does not have a spring source because it is formed by the confluence of the   Kröppenbach/Buchbach, which hydrologically is the source of the Salzbach, and the Storrbach which empties into it from the right between the villages of Langmühle and Salzwoog below the Devil's Table of Salzwoog. The Kröppenbach/Buchbach rises on the Hoher Kopf (467 m); the good  Storrbach on the Großer Spießkopf (414 m).

After this confluence, the Salzbach forms the parish boundary, for the rest of its  course, between Lemberg and Hinterweidenthal, then between Ruppertsweiler and Hinterweidenthal. In the hamlet of Salzwoog it flows through an eponymous pond. At the height of the Hinterweidenthal hamlet of Kaltenbach and below the Devil's Table of Kaltenbach, the Salzbach discharges from the right into the Wieslauter.

Tributaries 
Kleiner Kröppenbach (left), 
Großer Kröppenbach (left), 
Ransbächel (left), 
Brunnentalbach (left), 
Schimmelbach (left), 
Katzenbach (right), 
Storrbach (right), 
Steinbach (left)
Lindelbach (right), 
Schiffelsbach (left)
Walmersbach (left), 
Kaltenbach (left),

History 
The name of the stream does not refer to its salt (German: Salz) content, but to the old customs station of Salzwoog, where salt traders had to pay a tax on crossing the border between the territories of the Bishopric of Speyer and the Duchy of Palatinate-Zweibrücken. The former border post of Salzwoog lay on the bridge above the Salzbach, that now carries the state road, L 487 (Hinterweidenthal–Fischbach) and L 486 (Lemberg–Dahn) over the pond.

See also 
List of rivers of Rhineland-Palatinate

Rivers of Rhineland-Palatinate
Rivers and lakes of the Palatinate Forest
Südwestpfalz
Rivers of Germany